Shamolagus is an extinct genus of lagomorphs that lived in present-day China and Mongolia during the Eocene epoch. It contains two species, both of which are now extinct: Shamolagus grangeri and S. medius.

References

Prehistoric lagomorphs
Eocene mammals
Prehistoric placental genera